Vangueria schliebenii is a species of flowering plant in the family Rubiaceae. It is endemic to Tanzania.

References

External links 
 World Checklist of Rubiaceae

Endemic flora of Tanzania
Endangered plants
schliebenii
Taxonomy articles created by Polbot
Taxobox binomials not recognized by IUCN